Davage T. Minor (February 23, 1922 – March 14, 1998) was a player in the National Basketball Association (NBA). He played with the Baltimore Bullets before being traded along with Stan Miasek to the Milwaukee Hawks for Don Boven, Pete Darcey and George McLeod. He began his college career at Toledo, it was interrupted by World War II; following the war, he enrolled at UCLA.  In 1947–1948, Minor was honored as an All-Conference guard basketball player at UCLA. His full name was Davage Minor, but Gary, Indiana sportswriters called him "The Wheelhorse of Steel City." He began shooting the first jumpers seen around the Great Lakes in December 1937 in his high school gym in Gary. By 1941, the shot was so unstoppable he used it to take the Froebel High School Blue Devils all the way to the Final Four of the Indiana state tournament, the "mother of them all." Eventually, he starred with the old Oakland Bittners of the AAU, and he was one of the first five African Americans signed in the NBA. Minor died in 1998.

In December 2019, he was announced as a member of the 2020 Class in the Indiana Basketball Hall of Fame.

References

External links

1922 births
1998 deaths
All-American college men's basketball players
Amateur Athletic Union men's basketball players
American men's basketball players
Baltimore Bullets (1944–1954) players
Basketball players from Missouri
Milwaukee Hawks players
Point guards
Shooting guards
Toledo Rockets men's basketball players
UCLA Bruins men's basketball players
Undrafted National Basketball Association players